The Naval battle off St. John took place on 22 September 1691 between France and England toward the beginning of King William's War in the Bay of Fundy off present-day Saint John, New Brunswick. The English ship sailed with the new British Governor of Acadia Edward Tyng  while the French ship sailed with the French Governor of Acadia Joseph Robineau de Villebon.

Battle

Philips had conquered Port Royal in 1690. He sent Tyng in a ketch under the command of John Nelson to be the new British Governor of Acadia. Tyng was in a ketch of Andrew Belcher’s. On 2 September, the new Governor was attacked by Villebon who was in the French frigate Soleil d’Afrique (32 guns), commanded by Simon-Pierre Denys de Bonaventure. The English quickly capitulated. English captive John Alden was sent to Boston to arrange a prisoner exchange.

Aftermath
Alden was sent to Boston to get 60 French soldiers captured by Phips in the Battle of Port Royal (1690). Alden’s son and Colonel Tyng were held as hostages, and Nelson was sent to Quebec.

While in prison, Nelson sent intelligence to Boston about French plans for attacks against the Massachusetts colonies. For this act, Nelson was punished by being transported across the Atlantic Ocean to the Bastille prison in France. In 1702, after ten years of imprisonment, he was released and returned home to Nelson's Island (Long Island) as a local hero.

Alden returned to Villebon at the Saint John in May 1692, bringing with him only six French soldiers. As a result, Alden’s son and Colonel Tyng were subsequently sent to France.
Tyng died in captivity at La Rochelle.

See also 

 Military history of Nova Scotia

References

Bibliography
 
 
Hannay, James.  The history of Acadia, from its first discovery to its surrender to England
 John Clarence Webster. Acadia at the End of the Seventeenth Century. Saint John, NB, The New Brunswick Museum, 1979.

Primary Sources
Testimonies of Capt. Simon-Pierre Denys de Bonavanture, Ensign Anthoine Gaigneau, and Mahieu de Goutin, April 1692, Archives departmentales de la Charente-Maritime, Admieraute de La Rochelle, Series B, 5906, piece no. 4;
 Charles de Monseignat, Narrative of the most remarkable occurrences in Canada. 1690, 1691,  New York Collection Documents, IX : 527
Journal of Gov. Villebon, October 13, 1691 to October 25, 1692, Webster. Acadia, 32, 36.
Villebon's Journal, p. 32, 149

Military history of Acadia
Military history of New England
Military history of Canada
Naval battles involving England
Naval battles involving France
Conflicts in 1691
Conflicts in Nova Scotia
King William's War
Maritime history of Canada
1691 in North America
Conflicts in New Brunswick